Marcin Smoliński (born 5 April 1985 in Warsaw) is a Polish footballer who plays as a midfielder for Huragan Wołomin.

Career

Club

Smoliński started his career with GKP Targówek.

When he came to Legia, he was hailed as the new Kowalczyk, because of his personality and former place of living. However his talent didn't develop to match Kowalczyk's. He spent autumn 2006 on loan with Odra Wodzisław.

In February 2009, he was loaned to ŁKS Łódź on a half year deal.

In July 2010, he joined ŁKS Łódź on a one-year contract.

Ahead of the 2019/20, Smoliński joined Huragan Wołomin.

International
He was a part of Poland national under-21 football team.

References

External links
 
 

1985 births
Living people
Polish footballers
Ekstraklasa players
I liga players
II liga players
Legia Warsaw players
Odra Wodzisław Śląski players
ŁKS Łódź players
Olimpia Grudziądz players
Znicz Pruszków players
Footballers from Warsaw
Association football midfielders
Poland under-21 international footballers